Chechen cuisine is the traditional folk cuisine of the Chechen people, who dwell in the North Caucasus.

Chechen cuisine is vast and multifaceted. The basis of Chechen cuisine is: meat, leeks, cheese, pumpkin and corn. The main components of Chechen dishes include spicy seasonings, onion, wild garlic, pepper and thyme.

Chechen cuisine is known for having rich dishes, and is also typically simple to prepare and easily digestible.

Dishes

Main Dishes

  - Mutton stomach stuffed with ground meat, similar to Haggis.
  - Sort of pie filled with cottage cheese and wild garlic.
  -  (Pie) filled with lards and wild garlic.
  - Smoked meat
  - Sort of half-round pie filled with pumpkin and butter (or clarified butter). It is one of the most popular dishes of the Chechen cuisine.
  - Dumplings made from corn flour and filled with nettle.
  - Soup made of mutton or beef, tomatoes, potatoes, etc.
  -  (Sort of boiled dough) with meat (mostly mutton, chicken and beef).
  - Cottage cheese with butter.
  - Fried meat (mutton or beef) with vegetables.
  - Porridge with cheese.
 Shashlik - Traditional kebab from the Caucasus region, they are consumed throughout Chechnya.
  - Fried cornbreads.
  - Sauce made of Sour cream and cottage cheese. Often accompanied with Chechen corn breads.
  - Sausage made of wheat flour, mutton meat (minced), chicken fat and garlic.

  - soup made from lamb, onions, tomatoes, and garnished with sour cream

Desserts
  - Helva made from corn flour.
  - Helva made from wheat flour.
  - Helva made from wheat flour in form of noodles.
  - Sort of pancakes with honey.
 Vieta (dish) is a Chechen national dish of flax seeds with a thick liquid mass of dark brown color obtained from chopped fried or simply dried flax seeds by grinding in millstones. It is used in the traditional cuisine of Chechens, like a nutritious sweet dish, mixing with sugar or honey and oil. Any can be added oil: vegetable or cream melted. Vieta - “Linum” has long been common among Chechens; An exquisite dish is prepared from his ground seeds - linum pasta - by frying linseed flour in boiling oil in sugar or honey. Chechens prepare a dish only from seeds linum (flax).

References

External links
 National Cuisine of Chechnya (sun-trek.ru)

Chechen culture
Cuisine by ethnicity
Indigenous cuisine